Trigger Fingers is a 1946 American Western film directed by Lambert Hillyer and starring Johnny Mack Brown, Raymond Hatton and Jennifer Holt.

Cast
 Johnny Mack Brown as Sam 'Hurricane' Benton 
 Raymond Hatton as Pinto Peters 
 Jennifer Holt as Jane Caldwell 
 Riley Hill as Jimmy Peters 
 Steve Clark as Sloppy Langford 
 Eddie Parker as Smoke Turner 
 Ted Adams as Stub Allen 
 Pierce Lyden as Red - Henchman 
 Cactus Mack as Knuckles - Henchman 
 Ed Cassidy as Sheriff Caldwell

References

Bibliography
 Bernard A. Drew. Motion Picture Series and Sequels: A Reference Guide. Routledge, 2013.

External links

1946 films
American Western (genre) films
American black-and-white films
1946 Western (genre) films
Films directed by Lambert Hillyer
Monogram Pictures films
1940s English-language films
1940s American films